Aghanashini / Agaçaim (pronounced Aagshi) or Agassaim, is a village on the northern banks of the Zuari River in Tiswadi, Goa, surrounded by Panjim to the north, Margão to the south, Vasco da Gama to the west and Ponda to the east, thus making it a main connection between North Goa and South Goa via the Zuari Bridge. Agaçaim is famous for its Goan chouriço.

History
Agaçaim was a bazaar/mercado/market or mercantile-cum-migrating Christian community on the fringes of the Indian Ocean and is attested by the discovery of stone crosses with Pahlavi (archaic Persian) inscription in several places along the west coast of India.  The 2001 discovery of a granite stone cross  by Father Cosme Costa, sfx, has been dated to the seventh century with a Pahlavi inscription.

Agassaim near Agaçaim has played a significant role in the political scene of Goa, be it the Save Goa Campaign or the Konkani language agitation in 1986. During these events, 7 martyrs died for the Konkani language.

References

Cities and towns in North Goa district